Local elections were held in Kisii to elect a Governor and County Assembly on March 4, 2013. Under the new constitution, which was passed in a 2010 referendum, the 2013 general elections were the first in which Governors and members of the County Assemblies for the newly created counties were elected.  They will also be the first general elections run by the Independent Electoral and Boundaries Commission(IEBC) which has released the official list of candidates.

Gubernatorial election

Prospective candidates
The following are some of the candidates who have made public their intentions to run for office of governor in Kisii county:

 Peter Ndemo - A former District Commissioner retired from the civil service
 James Ongwae - former Agriculture Permanent Secretary
 Naftali Mogere - former National Social Security Fund CEO
 Zadoc Ogutu  - a university lecturer
 Lumumba Nyaberi - lawyer

References

2013 local elections in Kenya